Asociación de Fomento Deportivo Riestra Barrio Colón, also known as Deportivo Riestra, is an Argentine sports club from Buenos Aires. The club is mainly focused on football, with the senior squad currently playing in Primera B Nacional, the second division of the Argentine league system. Besides, the futsal team plays in Primera D, the fourth tier division. Deportiva Riestra also has youth and women's teams competing in different tournaments and divisions.

The club headquarters are located in the Nueva Pompeya neighbourhood, with Guillermo Laza Stadium of Villa Soldati as venue for football matches. The stadium has a capacity of 3,000. 

Apart from football, Riestra is affiliated to the "Federación Metropolitana de Ajedrez" (Metropolitan Chess Federation).

History

Initial years

The origins of Deportivo Riestra trace back to 1929, when a group of youths from Nueva Pompeya formed a football team to compete in local tournaments. They became known as "the Riestra ones", due to the name of the avenue where they used to gather, right next to a milk store. On February 22, 1931 they formally founded the club, and they rented a place as headquarters later that year.

Riestra affiliated to the Argentine Football Association in 1946, after negotiations by Pascual Trímboli, then president of the club and later head of department in the Association. The Blanquinegro official debut was a 3–2 loss against San Telmo. Riestra played those years in Primera C, but they were later transferred to the new Primera D, becoming one of the founder squads of that division. In 1950 Riestra inaugurated its first stadium in the Villa Soldati neighbourhood.

First achievement and stay in Primera C
Riestra won its first official tournament in 1953, as Primera D champions. The Blanquinegro squad earned 39 points in 26 games, with a 2-point lead against Juventud de Bernal, in a tournament that also featured Almirante Brown and Deportivo Morón. Deportivo Riestra stayed in Primera C for the next two decades, but without any successful seasons the club was not close to promotion positions. An 18th place in 1963 would have meant relegation for them, but the annulment of relegations that year allowed the team to stay. Riestra won the Reclasificación tournament in 1969, a playoff involving many teams trying to avoid relegation, which would be the only achievement for them in this spell in Primera C. In 1971 the club had its current name after merging with 'Asociación de Fomento Barrio Colón', an organization established in 1929 by businessmen and professionals that performed social activities and lobbied for improvements in the neighbourhood.

Riestra's performance changed in 1977, when the Blanquinegro achieved third place in the Primera C tournament that, even when distance to champions Sarmiento was 10 points, indicated a better shape in play. However, the next seasons showed the team back in the last positions. Finally, Riestra finished last in the 1981 tournament and was relegated for the first time, in the same year that the military dictatorship took its stadium to build a highway.

Instability and revival
The return to Primera D wouldn't have Riestra in the top positions, but more frequently in the middle of the table. In 1986, after a restructuring of AFA tournaments, a six-month season was played with promotion for the top six teams. Riestra qualified to the Final Round of the tournament after finishing third in its pool with 13 points, only one ahead of rivals Sacachispas. The Blanquinegro then won 4 out of 5 games in the Final Round, winning the tournament and promoting back to Primera C.

The following years were unstable for them, who were not able to keep their spot in Primera C after relegation in its first season back. Three seasons later, Riestra suffered its first (and so far only) disaffiliation after being last in Primera D averages. The season out of competition meant a revival for Riestra, that achieved success in the following season, qualifying for the playoff tournaments three years in a row. In the 1993–94 season, the Blanquinegro squad achieved to be runners-up of both Apertura and Clausura tournaments, and won the playoff championship after defeating Lamadrid 7–0 on aggregate. and Cañuelas 3–2 in the finals. They achieved promotion to Primera C again with a campaign that starred Francisco Berscé as goalkeeper and Julio Sánchez as top scorer, with 19 goals.

Back in Primera C, Riestra was again close to relegation, which was avoided after winning a playoff match 2–1 against Comunicaciones. The following seasons were successful, with two qualifications to playoff for promotion. However, Riestra was not able to keep the good performance, and was relegated back to Primera D in the 2001–02 season. The Blanquinegro squad did not improve in the following years, and by 2005–06 was the second last average of the league, avoiding a new disaffiliation by just one point. Riestra qualified again for playoffs in 2007–08 after 11 seasons, ending the championship in the ninth position. The Malevos achieved a good performance again in the 2008–09 season, when they were runners-up just three points behind champions Midland. A few days later Riestra won the playoff tournament after defeating Argentino de Quilmes 1–0 in the finals, qualifying for the Promotion playoff against Primera C side Defensores Unidos. After winning the first leg 3–2 at home, Riestra lost 1–0 away and was not promoted on rules advantage for the highest tier team.

Historic campaigns and double promotion

During the following seasons Riestra achieved several good results, qualifying many times to the playoffs, though without getting promotion back to Primera C. In 2011, Riestra became the first Primera D squad to qualify to Copa Argentina's Round of 32. The Blanquinegro side had a remarkable performance in the 2011–12 tournament, in which defeated Muñiz 1–0 in the First Round, and managed to drive Los Andes and Acassuso, two Primera B teams to goalless draws, qualifying on penalty kicks. In a historical draw, Riestra met Quilmes, then a second division team, in San Fernando del Valle de Catamarca, achieving a 0–0 tie and being eliminated only in the penalty kicks.

For the 2012–13 season a sponsor brought to the club an integral project for the development of football, building a semi-professional structure assisted by the counselling of Diego Maradona, which generated an unprecedented publicity of the club in worldwide media. The campaign in that season was again successful for the Blanquinegro, that became again runners-up of the Primera D, after champions Argentino de Quilmes. Riestra was not able to promote after losing playoff finals to Ituzaingó on penalty kicks after a 2–2 aggregate score.

A year later, the Blanquinegro squad achieved their second Primera D championship. They won 75 points, remaining unbeaten throughout the second round of the tournament, and with just 3 losses in the entire season. Jonathan Herrera, with 26 goals, became top scorer of the Primera D championship and of all AFA tournaments combined. The team also featured Jonathan Goya and Bruno Maffoni as midfielders, with 31 games, and Jorge Benítez in defence, in 30 games. This promotion meant for Riestra their debut in professional football for the following season.

The return to Primera C would be successful for the Blanquinegro side, with very quick success. The 2014 season was played in a six-month spell with three promotions due to a new arrangement of AFA tournaments. Surprisingly, Riestra achieved the second position in their pool, 3 points behind winners Defensores de Belgrano, and ahead Dock Sud. The Nueva Pompeya side qualified to the playoffs, where they first met Excursionistas, drawing 2–2 on aggregate and qualifying to the finals on penalty kicks. Riestra met Dock Sud in the finals and defeated them 4–1 on aggregate to promote to Primera B for the first time in history. Riestra featured Gustavo Ruhl as goalkeeper in every match of the tournament, and Gonzalo Peralta as defender in all but one games. Jonathan Herrera scored 19 goals and became top scorer of all tournaments combined for the second season in a row. The Blanquinegro squad thus achieved two promotions within one year, an accomplishment a few times seen in Argentine football.

Current events

Riestra's debut in Primera B came with success. They achieved to defeat more experienced sides as Platense and Almirante Brown, and also Brown and Almagro, the sides that would be promoted that season. These results drove the Blanquinegro side to the top positions of the tournament at the beginning, reaching third by the end of the first round. However, Riestra showed a poor performance in the second round that left them in the 14th position by the end of the season, thus missing playoffs but managing to stay in the division as their initial goal was. As a distinctive achievement Jonathan Herrera became top scorer of all AFA tournaments for the third time in a row, an unparalleled feat in modern Argentine football.

Regarding the cup competition the Blanquinegro side reached Round of 32 for the second time, in which they first met a Primera División side, losing 3–1 to Rosario Central.

The Malevos signed many new players for the six-month 2016 season, especially defenders, with the objective of avoiding relegation once again. The results were not good at the beginning, with a 7 matches winless streak. After a coach change results improved and Riestra managed to win five games and stay in Primera B for another season.

The team accomplished their best historical performance in the 2016–17 league season, becoming runners-up of the Primera B in their third season in the division. Riestra placed in the top positions since the beginning and was the top scorer team in the season, with 53 goals in 36 games, scoring more than three at home against Defensores de Belgrano, Platense and Talleres, and also away at Almirante Brown and Colegiales. In the playoffs, Riestra reached the finals after a home draw against Platense and an aggregate 2–1 win against Deportivo Español. The finals featured 4th placed team Comunicaciones amidst some controversy due to a field invasion with five minutes to go, allegedly by a Riestra player, and also other regulation breaches reported by rivals and the press. AFA upheld some of the accusations while dismissed others, and decided continuation of the match in a neutral field, and several penalties for Deportivo Riestra, including a 20-point deduction the following season, later reduced to 10 points on an appeal. The match went on a few days later with a Blanquinegro victory 2–1, which were promoted to second division for the first time in their history.

The Blanquinegro squad also achieved their best in the cup competition of the season, reaching the Round of 16 for the first time after defeating Tigre on penalty kicks, before being eliminated once again by Rosario Central.

The team had some remarkable matches in their Primera B Nacional debut, including victories against the top three teams in the competition: Aldosivi, Almagro and San Martín. Despite their campaign, that would have had the team qualified to the Reducido, Riestra ended the season in the relegation zone due to the 10-point deduction related to previous season incidents. The club made an appeal at the Court of Arbitration for Sports, which agreed to take the case, an unprecedented event in Argentine football. After a negative decision from the Court, Riestra was relegated back to Primera B for the next season.

Riestra kept the roster mostly unchanged back in Primera B, completing a 17-match undefeated strike that made them lead the tournament. However, 4 defeats in a row took them down to the sixth position. After a change in management and the return of Jonathan Herrera back from loan, the Nueva Pompeya squad would complete another set of 11 matches without losses, including two victories against derby rivals Sacachispas. The Blanquinegros clinched a spot in the next Primera B Nacional season after finishing fourth in the league. Riestra's Gonzalo Bravo was the top goalscorer of the tournament, with 20 goals in the season.

Playing kit

Deportivo Riestra's kit has traditionally been black and white vertical stripes, aligned with the club's colours, which were taken from the ancient El Trueno (Spanish for The Thunder) team, who lent old kits to Riestra in their beginnings. Starting in 2012, with the arrival of a new sponsor, Riestra wears black shirts with white details.

Sponsors and manufacturers

Stadium

Deportivo Riestra own the Guillermo Laza stadium, where they send their home matches. Located in the Villa Soldati neighbourhood in Buenos Aires, it has a capacity is 3,000 in its three stands, one of which is for seating. Its facilities include press cabins, training field and indoor stadium.

Riestra first used a field in the Nueva Pompeya neighbourhood, until they built their first stadium in Lacarra Avenue of Villa Soldati in 1950. The Blanquinegro squad owned this field until 1981, when Riestra suffered its expropriation by the Argentine military dictatorship to build a highway. Afterwards, Riestra remained without a home field for more than 12 years, sending home matches to nearby stadiums such as Barracas Central and Sacachispas fields.

The Blanquinegro club acquired a 2.5 hectares field to build a sports complex in 1979. After losing their stadium, plans were changed to build a new stadium in the place. On 20 February 1993 the Guillermo Laza stadium was opened, named to honour a former vice-president of the club. Riestra defeated Atlas 1–0 that day, their first match in the new stadium.

In 2009 Riestra made the last payment of their mortgage, an important upside for the club's financial position. Between 2012 and 2013 the club made several improvements to their property, including training facilities to host youth teams fixtures, as well as a new full-seater stand with a capacity of 500. In 2015 the Héctor Salorio indoor stadium was inaugurated, used by the futsal teams with a capacity of 200.

Players

Current squad

Out on loan

Records

Most goals

Most appearances

Honours

Titles
Primera D (2): 1953, 2013–14

Other achievements
Primera B
 runners-up (1): 2016–17
 playoff winners (1): 2016–17
Primera C 
 playoff winners (1): 2014
 Reclasificación winners (1): 1969
Primera D
 runners-up (2): 2008–09, 2012–13
 playoff winners (2): 1993–94, 2008–09
 Transición winners (1): 1986

Other sports and social activities

Youth football

Besides professional football, Deportivo Riestra is home to a Reserves team and amateur youth teams, both within AFA and local tournaments. Riestra also fields a team in the official Senior Tournament.

Futsal

Riestra started practising futsal in 2012 in AFA second division. After a spell in their participation, the club resumed the team in 2017 at Primera D, fourth division in the futsal league system. Riestra's futsal section also has Reserves and youth teams.

Other
Deportivo Riestra has traditionally had a chess section, affiliated to the Metropolitan Chess Federation, and more recently the Copa Cultura AFA, which they won in 2017. The club's headquarters also host recreational sports and activities such as boxing, roller skating, martial arts, yoga and tango, and a retirees club.

References

External links

 

 
Association football clubs established in 1931
Football clubs in Buenos Aires
1931 establishments in Argentina